Kanam Rajendran (born 10 November 1950) is an Indian politician and a member of the Communist Party of India. He represented Vazhoor constituency in the Kerala Legislative Assembly  from 1982 to 1991. In March 2015, he was elected the Secretary of Communist Party of India Kerala State Council.

Positions held
 Secretary, Communist Party of India (CPI) Kerala State Committee
 Secretary, All India Youth Federation (AIYF) Kerala State Committee
 Secretary, All India Trade Union Congress (AITUC) Kerala State Committee
 Vice President, AIYF National Council
 Member, CPI State Secretariat
 Member, 7th Kerala Legislative Assembly (1982–87)
 Member, 8th Kerala Legislative Assembly (1987–91)
 Chairman, Committee on Government Assurances (1984–87)

References

External links

Communist Party of India politicians from Kerala
People from Kottayam district
1950 births
Living people
Malayali politicians
Kerala MLAs 1982–1987
Kerala MLAs 1987–1991